Larry Cohn may refer to:

 Lawrence Cohn (born 1932), American lawyer, blues collector and record company executive
 Lawrence H. Cohn (1937–2016), American cardiac surgeon and educator